Jason Tali is a Papua New Guinean rugby league footballer who plays as a  for Doncaster in Betfred League 1. He represented Papua New Guinea in the 2013 World Cup.

Playing career
He plays for Doncaster in Betfred League 1 in England. His position is at centre.

References

External links
Doncaster profile

1987 births
Living people
Doncaster R.L.F.C. players
Hagen Eagles players
Newcastle Thunder players
Papua New Guinean rugby league players
Papua New Guinean sportsmen
Papua New Guinea national rugby league team players
Rugby league centres